Monica Bandini (November 16, 1964 – April 19, 2021) was an Italian racing cyclist. Her biggest achievement in the sport was winning the world title in the women's team time trial (1988), alongside Maria Canins, Roberta Bonanomi, and Francesca Galli.

References

External links

1964 births
2021 deaths
Italian female cyclists
People from Faenza
UCI Road World Champions (women)
Sportspeople from the Province of Ravenna
Cyclists from Emilia-Romagna